Tulips  is a 1981 Canadian-American comedy-drama film starring Gabe Kaplan and Bernadette Peters. The director was officially credited as "Stan Ferris", but the film was actually directed by Rex Bromfield, Mark Warren and Al Waxman.

Plot
Leland Irving (Gabe Kaplan) is depressed and lonely but his attempts at suicide are unsuccessful. He hires a professional hit man, Maurice Avocado (Henry Gibson) to kill him; Avocado will use the code word "Tulips" when the time is at hand.  While awaiting his fate, Leland comes across a woman—Rutanya Wallace (Bernadette Peters)--who is attempting suicide, and saves her.  Rutanya is suffering from being rejected by a lover, but is charmingly unconventional and outgoing, the opposite of Leland's introvert.  Their lives become intertwined, and although wary and battling initially, they fall in love and marry.

However, now that they have found each other, they must call off the hit by Avocado, and complications arise. When Avocado will not agree to calling off the hit, Leland and Rutanya desperately try to obtain guns, etc., to attempt to kill the killer.  In the end, no one dies.

In one of the early scenes of their courtship, Leland plays the tuba while Rutanya sings "Sidewalks of New York".

Cast
Gabe Kaplan — Leland Irving
Bernadette Peters — Rutanya Wallace
Henry Gibson — Maurice Avocado
Al Waxman — Bert Irving
Dave Boxer — Dr. Carl Walburn
Howard Urley - Bouncer

External links
 
 

1981 comedy-drama films
1981 films
English-language Canadian films
American comedy-drama films
Canadian comedy-drama films
Embassy Pictures films
Films directed by Rex Bromfield
Films produced by Don Carmody
1981 comedy films
1981 drama films
Films about contract killing
Films about suicide
1980s English-language films
1980s American films
1980s Canadian films